Grindelwald Grund is a railway station in the village and municipality of Grindelwald in the Swiss canton of Bern. The station is served by the Wengernalpbahn (WAB), whose trains operate from Grindelwald to Kleine Scheidegg. It takes its name from the Grund area of the village, in which it is located.

WAB trains commence their journey at Grindelwald station, where they connect with trains of the Berner Oberland Bahn from Interlaken, and initially descend steeply to Grindelwald Grund station. At Grindelwald Grund they reverse and commence their ascent to Kleine Scheidegg, entering and leaving the station by its southern end. Depots and workshops are situated at both ends of the station.

Services 

The station is served by the following passenger trains:

The station is surrounded by extensive car parking, and is the principal starting point of a journey to Kleine Scheidegg, and onward to the Jungfraujoch, for passengers arriving in Grindelwald by car. It is also the connection to the Grindelwald–Männlichen gondola cableway.

Gallery

References

External links 
 
 Grindelwald Grund station page on the Jungfraubahnen web site 

Railway stations in the canton of Bern
Grindelwald
Railway stations in Switzerland opened in 1893